The Mountain Goats are an American band formed in Claremont, California, by singer-songwriter John Darnielle. The band is currently based in Durham, North Carolina. For many years, the sole member of the Mountain Goats was Darnielle, despite the plural moniker. Although he remains the core member of the band, he has worked with a variety of collaborators over time, including bassist and vocalist Peter Hughes, drummer Jon Wurster, multi-instrumentalist Matt Douglas, singer-songwriter Franklin Bruno, bassist and vocalist Rachel Ware, singer-songwriter/producer John Vanderslice, guitarist Kaki King, and multi-instrumentalist Annie Clark.

Throughout the 1990s, the Mountain Goats were known for producing low-fidelity home recordings (most notably, on a cassette deck boombox) and releasing recordings in cassette or vinyl 7-inch formats.  Since 2002, the Mountain Goats have adopted a more polished approach, often recording studio albums with a full band.

History

Early years
The band's name is a reference to the Screamin' Jay Hawkins song "Yellow Coat". Darnielle released his first recording as the Mountain Goats (Taboo VI: The Homecoming, on Shrimper Records) in 1991. Many of his first recordings and performances featured Darnielle accompanied by members of the all-girl reggae band the Casual Girls, who became known as the Bright Mountain Choir. One of this group's members, Rachel Ware, continued to accompany Darnielle on bass, both live and in studio, until 1995.

The first five years of the Mountain Goats' career saw a prolific output of songs on cassette, vinyl and CD. These releases spanned multiple labels and countries of origin, often released in limited numbers. The focus of the Mountain Goats project was the urgency of writing. Songs not recorded adequately to tape within days of being written were often forgotten. Cassette releases during this time include The Hound Chronicles, Transmissions to Horace, Hot Garden Stomp, Taking the Dative, and Yam, the King of Crops.

In 1994, the Mountain Goats released their first full-length studio album, Zopilote Machine, on Ajax Records. It is the band's only full album featuring the entirety of the Bright Mountain Choir.

1995–2000: Sweden, Nothing for Juice, Full Force Galesburg, and The Coroner's Gambit

By 1995, most of what could be considered classic Mountain Goats conventions (boom-box recording, song series, Latin quotes, and mythological themes) were abandoned in favor of a more thematically focused and experimental sound. This period was marked by Darnielle's collaborations with other artists including Alastair Galbraith and Simon Joyner. In November 1996, Darnielle announced a vow to "clear his musical tendency for profanity" to promote a more optimistic reception to the ideas outlined in his material.

In 1995, the album Sweden was released. Soon after its recording, a sequel titled Hail and Farewell, Gothenburg was recorded, but never released. It remained unheard by the general public until 2007, when it was leaked against Darnielle's wishes. In 1996, the Mountain Goats released the album Nothing for Juice, and Full Force Galesburg the following year. Rachel Ware left the band between recording the two albums, and bassist Peter Hughes took over her position.

Between 1998 and 2000, the Mountain Goats slowed down their prolific output, releasing The Coroner's Gambit in October 2000. The album partially returned to the band's roots, as most songs were sporadically recorded on Darnielle's old Panasonic RX-FT500 cassette deck Boombox, which produced a loud background noise to the songs.

2001–2003: All Hail West Texas and Tallahassee
2002 saw the release of two Mountain Goats albums: All Hail West Texas and Tallahassee. These albums mark a distinct change in focus for the Mountain Goats project, being the first in a series of concept albums that explore aspects of The Mountain Goats' canon in depth. All Hail West Texas featured the resurrection of Darnielle's early boom box recording for a complete album. Darnielle considers this album to be the culmination of his lo-fi recording style. Tallahassee, the first Mountain Goats album to be recorded with a full band and in a studio, explores and concludes the relationship of a couple whose lives were the subject of the song cycle known as the Alpha Series. It was the first album to be released on a major label, marking the start of the 4AD years of the band.

Also released that year was Martial Arts Weekend, attributed to The Extra Glenns, a collaboration with Franklin Bruno on several previously unreleased Mountain Goats songs. Following that recording, Bruno joined Darnielle in the studio along with bassist Peter Hughes, who is the second official member of the band and accompanies Darnielle on tour. These three musicians formed what was considered the Mountain Goats studio band.

2004–2009: 4AD years
In 2004, the Mountain Goats released We Shall All Be Healed. The album marked a number of changes for the Mountain Goats, as it was the first time Darnielle worked with producer John Vanderslice, and the first album of directly autobiographical material. We Shall All Be Healed chronicles Darnielle's life with a group of friends and acquaintances addicted to methamphetamine in Portland, Oregon, though the album is set in Pomona, California. The following year, the band's second Vanderslice-produced album, The Sunset Tree, was released. Again autobiographical, Darnielle tackled the subject of his early childhood spent with an abusive stepfather. Darnielle had previously dealt with this subject in what he often refers to as the only "extensively autobiographical" song he had written before 2004, the 1999 unreleased song "You're in Maya". The Mountain Goats relocated to Durham, North Carolina in 2006, and issued Get Lonely, which was produced by Scott Solter, who had worked with Vanderslice on engineering for prior Mountain Goats records.

Jon Wurster joined the group in 2007, playing drums on the last leg of the Get Lonely tour. The band recorded tracks for its next album at Prairie Sun studios. Entitled Heretic Pride, the album was released on 19 February 2008. Produced by John Vanderslice and Scott Solter, the album saw Darnielle, Hughes, and Wurster joined by Franklin Bruno, Erik Friedlander, Annie Clark (better known by her stage name, St. Vincent), and members of The Bright Mountain Choir. American alternative hip hop artist Aesop Rock released a remix of the track "Lovecraft in Brooklyn" from the album, and in return Darnielle contributed vocals to his album None Shall Pass, in the song "Coffee".

In 2009, Darnielle and Vanderslice collaborated on the record Moon Colony Bloodbath. Released in a limited vinyl run of 1000 and sold during their "Gone Primitive" tour, the EP was a concept record about organ harvesting colonies on the Moon. This was followed by the next full Mountain Goats album, The Life of the World to Come, which released in October of the same year. The album is composed of twelve tracks, each one inspired by (and titled after) a single verse of the Christian Bible. In publicizing the record, the band made their first ever television appearance, performing "Psalms 40:2" on The Colbert Report, hosted by professed Mountain Goats fan Stephen Colbert.

2010–present: Merge Records years
The Mountain Goats signed to Merge Records, home to drummer Jon Wurster's other band, Superchunk, in 2010. The label issued a new record by The Extra Lens, formerly The Extra Glenns, entitled Undercard, followed by another Mountain Goats LP, All Eternals Deck, in 2011. They were also chosen by Jeff Mangum of Neutral Milk Hotel to perform at the All Tomorrow's Parties festival that he was due to curate in December 2011 in Minehead, England, but were unable to appear due to a rescheduling.

The band's fourteenth studio album, Transcendental Youth, was released in late 2012, and in early 2013 they played at Carnegie Hall in support of John Green and Hank Green in their "Evening of Awesome" performance. In July 2013, All Hail West Texas was re-released on vinyl. During an interview with Stereogum in August 2012, John Darnielle said that Amy Grant was his favorite pop artist, and noted that "Rich Mullins is one of the best songwriters I know of." Mullins was the songwriter who penned many of Grant's hits.

The Mountain Goats released their 15th album, Beat the Champ, on 7 April 2015, again with Merge Records. According to Pitchfork Media, the album concentrates on the professional wrestlers Darnielle admired when he was a child and tries to develop and imagine their lives. Multi-instrumentalist Matt Douglas assisted the group in recording the album, and soon thereafter became a full-time member.

In January 2017, the Mountain Goats recorded a humorous song per request of director Rian Johnson, depicting an alternate story of his upcoming movie, Star Wars: The Last Jedi. The song, titled "The Ultimate Jedi Who Wastes All the Other Jedi and Eats Their Bones", was published on Johnson's SoundCloud page.

In May 2017, they released their sixteenth studio album, Goths. The band has stated that Goths was inspired by an adolescence listening to The Cure, Bauhaus, Siouxsie and the Banshees, and Joy Division, as well as hearing songs on the Californian radio station KROQ-FM.

In January 2019, the band announced the April 26 release of their Dungeons & Dragons inspired album, In League with Dragons (and released initial single, "Younger"), via Merge Records. The announcement was accompanied by a live music stream from the Wizards of the Coast headquarters.

In March 2020, while the COVID-19 pandemic left the band unable to tour, Darnielle retrieved his old Panasonic RX-FT500 tape deck and recorded 10 new songs, using the direct-to-boombox method for the first time since 2002's All Hail West Texas. The resulting album, entitled Songs for Pierre Chuvin, was inspired by Darnielle's reading of Pierre Chuvin's 1990 book A Chronicle of the Last Pagans, and was released digitally on April 10, 2020, with a limited physical release on cassette through Merge Records.

The Mountain Goats announced in August 2020 that the band's nineteenth studio album, Getting Into Knives, would be released on October 23, 2020, on CD, vinyl, cassette, and digital.

In April 2021, the Mountain Goats announced their album Dark in Here, released on June 25, alongside the release of its first single "Mobile". The album was recorded at FAME Studios.

Members
  John Darnielle – vocals, guitar, keyboard
  Peter Hughes – bass, backing vocals
  Jon Wurster – drums
  Matt Douglas – flute, saxophone, clarinet, guitar, keyboard, backing vocals

Former members and collaborators
  Rachel Ware – bass, vocals (1992–1995)
  The Bright Mountain Choir (Rachel Ware, Amy Piatt, Sarah Arslanian, Roseanne Lindley)
  The North Mass Mountain Choir
  Franklin Bruno – piano
  Lalitree Darnielle – banjo
  Alastair Galbraith – violin
  Graeme Jefferies – guitar
  John Vanderslice
  Erik Friedlander – cello
  Owen Pallett – strings
  Scott Solter
  Alex Decarville
  Richard Colburn – drums
  Christopher McGuire – drums
  Nora Danielson – violin
  Maggie Doyle – keytar
  Kaki King
 Yuval Semo – organ, piano, string arrangement

Discography

Studio albums
Zopilote Machine (1994)
Sweden (1995)
Nothing for Juice (1996)
Full Force Galesburg (1997)
The Coroner's Gambit (2000)
All Hail West Texas (2002)
Tallahassee (2002)
We Shall All Be Healed (2004)
The Sunset Tree (2005)
Get Lonely (2006)
Heretic Pride (2008)
The Life of the World to Come (2009)
All Eternals Deck (2011)
Transcendental Youth (2012)
Beat the Champ (2015)
Goths (2017)
In League with Dragons (2019)
Songs for Pierre Chuvin (2020)
Getting Into Knives (2020)
Dark in Here (2021)
Bleed Out (2022)

In other media
The band's music has been featured in the Showtime television series Weeds.  "Cotton" was prominently featured in the season one episode "The Punishment Light", and "International Small Arms Traffic Blues" was featured in the season four episode "Yes I Can."  The band performed the Theme to Weeds (Malvina Reynolds’ "Little Boxes") during the opening credits of Season 8, Episode 5.

The song "Love, Love, Love" was performed by Lili Rose McKay in the movie Welcome to Me.

Throughout the third season of the Adult Swim animated series Moral Orel, the songs "No Children", "Old College Try", and "Love Love Love" are featured.

The band made their television debut on October 6, 2009, playing "Psalms 40:2" on The Colbert Report. On January 19, 2010, they played "Genesis 3:23" on Late Night with Jimmy Fallon. On February 23, 2011, they played "Birth of Serpents" in support of their album, All Eternals Deck, on the Late Show with David Letterman. On April 6, 2015, the band performed "Foreign Object" on Late Night with Seth Meyers while promoting Beat the Champ. In July 2019, the band performed on The Late Show with Stephen Colbert, with Stephen Colbert joining in to sing "This Year".

The song "Up the Wolves", from the band's album The Sunset Tree, was featured in The Walking Dead'''s season four episode "Still".

The song "Game Shows Touch Our Lives", from the band's album Tallahassee, is quoted in the epigraph of John Green's novel Paper Towns. Additionally, the song "Used to Haunt" was played in the credits of the film adaptation.

The songs "Heel Turn 2" and "Sicilian Crest" originally premiered on the "weather report" section of the podcast Welcome to Night Vale.

On September 28, 2017, a podcast premiered entitled I Only Listen To The Mountain Goats, hosted by John Darnielle and Joseph Fink, co-creator of the podcast Welcome to Night Vale. The first season features track-by-track discussions of The Mountain Goats' album All Hail West Texas and features a guest artist performing a cover of that episode's featured song. A compilation album of all the covers featured on the show was released on April 6, 2018, the day after the season finale. A second season premiered in Spring 2019.

The song "No Children" was prominently featured in the series finale of You're the Worst''.

In December, 2020, Guardian readers voted "This Year" as the number one song for the "Good Riddance 2020" playlist.

References

Further reading
 Adams, Tim (2004). "Discography of The Mountain Goats". Retrieved 19 March 2005
 Adams, Tim (2005). "Mountain Goats Discography". Retrieved 19 March 2005
 themountaingoats.net staff (2004). "The Mountain Goats FAQ". Retrieved 20 March 2005
 unknown author (2003). "Tallahassee Biography". Retrieved 20 March 2005
 Nickey, Jason(2000). [ "Mountain Goats Biography"]. Retrieved 20 March 2005

External links

 Official site
 themountaingoats.net
 Five Tools Peter Hughes webpage with band photos and tour journals.
 
 

Indie rock musical groups from California
Musical collectives
4AD artists
Lo-fi music groups
American folk musical groups
American indie folk groups
Musicians from Durham, North Carolina
Merge Records artists
Shrimper Records artists
Absolutely Kosher Records artists